Agni Vayu is an Indian television drama series that premiered on 1 March 2021 on Ishara TV. Produced under KeyLight Production, it stars Shivani Tomar and Gautam Vig.

Plot
Agni Vayu is the saga of imperfect love; one that journeys through different shades of trust and honesty in a world of ambitious people, testing them endlessly at every turn.
Agni, a doctor, crosses paths with Vayu, an investment banker, and the two start to like each other. Together, they try to decipher the mysterious deaths of those who were close to them.

Cast

Main
 Shivani Tomar as Dr. Agni Awasthi – Virendra and Sudha's daughter, Vayu's love interest.
 Gautam Vig as Vayu – Agni and Kavya's love interest.

Recurring
 Karan Sharma as Dr. Virendra Awasthi – Agni's father, Sudha's husband (2021)
 Chitrapama Banerjee as Sudha Virendra Awasthi – Agni's mother, Virendra's wife (2021)
 Alika Nair as Arya Awasthi (Agni's sister)
 Neha Harsora as Ananya Awasthi (Agni's sister)
 Manuj Walia as Mehul (Arya's husband)
 Akshita as Manvi (Vayu's sister)
 Mehul Bhojak as Manvi's Husband (Vayu's Brother-In-Law)
 Riya Bhattacharjee as Kavya (Vayu's friend) (2021)
 Paras Randhawa as Shakti – Kavya's brother (2021)
 Meenakshi Kashyap as Priya (2021)
 Yogiraaj as Siddhant (Dr. Virendra Awasthi's Friend)
 Jatin Bhatia as Inspector Naitik (Vayu's Friend)
 Riyanka Chanda as Inspector Vaishnavi
 Javed Hyder as Ansari (Mechanic)
 Jyoti Mukherjee

Production

Broadcast
The production and airing of the show was halted indefinitely in May 2021 due to the COVID-19 outbreak in India. The series was expected to resume on mid-May 2021 but could not and the series was last broadcast in April 2021 airing its remaining episodes. Filming Of The Series Resumed In June 2021, New Episodes Air Mon-Fri 8:30PM IST.

References

External links 

 
 Agni Vayu on Ishara TV

2021 Indian television series debuts
Indian drama television series
Hindi-language television shows
Ishara TV original programming
Indian television soap operas